Oliver Clark (born January 4, 1939) is an American character actor.

Life and career
Clark was born Richard Mardirosian in Buffalo, New York, the son of Afro (née Karahos) and Matthew Mardirosian. He is of Armenian heritage. His brother, Tom Mardirosian, is also an actor. Clark made numerous appearances in film and television, particularly in the 1970s (notably as Mr. Farcus in the 1970 movie The Landlord, as Mr. Small in the 1971 film They Might Be Giants, and in the 1976 remake of A Star Is Born). Two of his best-known TV characters were John Doe #6 on the NBC drama St. Elsewhere, a likeable and humorous psychiatric patient, and Mr. Herd, a patient of psychologist Bob Hartley on The Bob Newhart Show, a long-running CBS situation comedy.  He played Mr. Belding in the original pilot of the series Good Morning Miss Bliss but was subsequently replaced by Dennis Haskins.

Clark also played Roger Barton on an episode of  The Golden Girls, and played Joe Carruthers, the man who later becomes Santa Claus, in the holiday comedy film Ernest Saves Christmas. He portrayed his Santa role again in the 1996 animated Christmas in Cartoontown.

Clark also appeared on two episodes of M*A*S*H, Season 5, Episode 16 "38 Across" as Hawkeye's college buddy who's now a Navy Doctor on board an aircraft carrier off the Korean coast, and a whiz at crossword puzzles. Hawkeye contacts him via telephone when he gets stuck on the final word to finish a puzzle, but a continual error in communication leads the buddy to believe a medical emergency is going on at MASH. He arrives in the company of a Naval medical officer, an Admiral, (Dick O'Neill) only to discover the real reason for the call. He also appears in Season 6, Episode 20 "Mail Call Three" as a second Captain Benjamin Pierce (an Infantry Officer), where each Captain had been mistakenly receiving the other's mail.

Clark also played roles on Barney Miller, appearing in six episodes:

 "The Layoff" (1975) ... Fur Thief
 "Noninvolvement" (1976) ... Charles "Charlie" Yusick
 "Hostage" (1978) ... Vern Bidell
 "The Dentist" (1979) ... Dr. Gesslin
 "The Doll" (1981) ... Eugene Corbin
 "Landmark: Part 3" (1982) ... Carl Ebling

Clark was a regular on the 1975 situation comedy Karen. In 1977, he appeared in an episode of the ABC crime drama The Feather and Father Gang.

In 1990 he appeared in 2 or 3 episodes of Life Goes On as teacher Mr. Leighton.

In 1995, he had a guest appearance on the sitcom Full House as DJ Tanner's (Candace Cameron-Bure) high school principal, Mr. Robolard, in the eighth-season episode "Up on the Roof". As a school prank, DJ, Kimmy (Andrea Barber), and Kimmy's boyfriend, Duane (Scott Menville) used a crane to lift his vintage car onto the roof of the school. Surprisingly, Mr. Robolard declared it "The best prank in the history of the school!"

References

External links

1937 births
American male film actors
American male television actors
American people of Armenian descent
Living people
20th-century American male actors
Ethnic Armenian male actors
Male actors from Buffalo, New York